Pristimantis dissimulatus is a species of frogs in the family Strabomantidae.

It is endemic to Ecuador.
Its natural habitat is tropical moist montane forests.
It is threatened by habitat loss.

References

dissimulatus
Amphibians of Ecuador
Endemic fauna of Ecuador
Amphibians described in 1997
Taxonomy articles created by Polbot